Camilo Luzuriaga (born in Loja, Ecuador 1953) is an Ecuadorian film producer, actor, writer, photographer, and director.

Filmmaking

Luzuriaga has produced, directed, edited, and written various movies, short films, and documentaries.

Luzuriaga's directorial debut was the film adaption of José de la Cuadra's novelette La Tigra (1989), which starred Lissette Cabrera, was hailed by critics as the rebirth of Ecuadorian cinema.

One of his most renowned films is Entre Marx y Una Mujer Desnuda (Between Marx and a Naked Woman) (1996) based on the 1976 novel written by the Ecuadorian writer Jorge Enrique Adoum. The film is in Spanish with English and French subtitles. The film won Best Art Direction at the 18th Havana Film Festival, Best Script and Best Sound Track at the Trieste Film Festival, and was Nominated for Best Foreign Film by the Spanish Academy of Arts and Cinematographic Sciences, 1997. Michael Wilmington of the Chicago Tribune called the film, "One of the fest's major surprises is this startlingly inventive and sophisticated, beautifully done film from tiny Ecuador... packed with wit, energy, passion, intelligence, high style and memorable characters... the movie is wildly creative and funny."

Luzuriaga adapted an historical novel by Juan Valdano into the film, 1809-1810 mientras llega el día (2004) which related the story of  the independence of Quito.

He played Captain Bolivar Rojas in the movie Chronicles directed by Sebastián Cordero starring John Leguizamo. He was also the local producer of Proof of Life directed by Taylor Hackford starring Meg Ryan and Russell Crowe.

Photography career

Luzuriaga has been a photographer since 1971, and has had five solo exhibitions. He organized the First Contemporary National Photography Festival in Ecuador (1982). He was a photography teacher at the Central University's School of Art in Quito until 1987, at the Catholic University's School of Design in Quito until 1994 and at the Film and Acting Workshop until 2002.

Awards

 Best Art Direction, 18th Havana Film Festival. "Between Marx and a Naked Woman" (1996) Director and producer. 
 Best Screenplay and Best Sound Track, 12th Trieste Film Festival. "Between Marx and a Naked Woman" (1996) Director and producer. 
 Best Film and Best Opera Prima, 29th Cartagena Film Festival. "The Tigress" (1990) Writer and director.
 Best educational film, 6th Havana Film Festival. "The Mangroves Are Going" (1984) Co-director and editor.
 Second Best Film, 2nd Film Festival of the Indian People, Rio de Janeiro. "This Is What We Think" (1983) Director and editor.
 Best Children's Film, Tampere Film Festival, Finland. "Wonder Chacón" (1982) Co-director and editor.
 Second Best Film, 2nd Ecuadorian Film Festival. "Don Eloy" (1981) Co-director and editor.
 Best Super-8 Film, First Ecuadorian Film Festival. "Cañari Land", documentary film (1977) Filmmaker.

Filmography 

Producer
 Huellas (2012) producer
 Distante Cercanía: La ley del más vivo (2012) associate producer (trailer)
 Jericó (Short) (2012) (producer)
 Touché (Video short) (2011) executive producer
 Nubes distantes (Short) (2010) producer
 Bienaventurados (Short) (2010) producer
 Rendiciones (Short) (2010) producer
 Los Canallas (2009) - producer
 Proof of Life (2000) local producer

Director
 1809-1810 mientras llega el día (2004)
 Cara o cruz (2003)
 Entre Marx y Una Mujer Desnuda (1996)
 La tigra (1990) (trailer)

Writer
 1809-1810 mientras llega el día (2004) adaptation
 Cara o cruz (2003) writer
 La tigra (1989)

Actor
 Ochentaysiete (2012) role: father of Andrés
 Crónicas (2004) role: Captain Bolivar Rojas

References
Instituto de cide y de actuacion - Camilo Luzuriaga

External links
 
  (Spanish)

1953 births
Living people
Ecuadorian film directors
People from Loja, Ecuador
Ecuadorian photographers